Charlie Palmer (born 10 July 1963) was an English professional footballer who played in the 1980s and 90s for a variety of clubs in England at right-back and latterly centre-back.

Playing career
Born in Aylesbury, Palmer started his football career as an apprentice at Watford, managed by Graham Taylor. He played 18 matches for Watford in all competitions between 1981 and 1984, including four in the UEFA Cup. In July 1984, Palmer moved to Derby County on a free transfer. Under the management of Arthur Cox, he was part of the team that won the Football League Second Division in the 1986–87 season. However, before the end of that season, Palmer moved to Hull City, for a transfer fee of £30,000. After a two-year stay in Hull, he moved to Notts County, under the management of Neil Warnock.

The next few years had journeys to Wembley Stadium to play in consecutive playoff finals, winning both. Then an Anglo-Italian Cup Final against Brescia, led by Gheorghe Hagi. During this time at Notts, Charlie Palmer is probably best remembered for the winning goal against city rivals Nottingham Forest in the local derby. Palmer moved on to Walsall in 1994, before moving on to non-League clubs Burton Albion, Moor Green and Hinckley United.

Coaching career
Since finishing playing, Palmer has coached Hinckley United in the Conference North under the management of ex-Notts colleague Dean Thomas, and was later assistant manager at Mickleover Sports, where he was briefly caretaker manager during the 2012–13 season. On 14 April 2013 Palmer took over as manager of Northern Counties East Premier Division club Long Eaton United, replacing former Notts County player Mick Galloway who left the club in March 2013. He remained at Long Eaton until October 2015 when he took over as manager at Belper Town. He resigned as manager at the end of the 2016–17 season.

Honours
Walsall
Football League Third Division runner-up: 1994–95

References

External links
Charlie Palmer career statistics On Cloud Seven

1963 births
Living people
Sportspeople from Aylesbury
English footballers
Watford F.C. players
Derby County F.C. players
Hull City A.F.C. players
Notts County F.C. players
Walsall F.C. players
Burton Albion F.C. players
Moor Green F.C. players
Hinckley United F.C. players
English Football League players
English football managers
Mickleover Sports F.C. managers
Long Eaton United F.C. managers
Belper Town F.C. managers
Association football defenders
Footballers from Buckinghamshire